Nikolaos Platanos (or Nikos Platanos) (born 12 April 1984) is a Greek footballer currently playing for Football League 2 side Panelefsiniakos.

Career
Platanos began his pro career with Panelefsiniakos in 2001–2002 season in the Football League 2. After approximately 200 games with Proodeftiki, Kalamata, Ethnikos Asteras, Pierikos, Diagoras, Vyzas Megaron, Iraklis Psachna and Kallithea in Football League 2 and Football League, he returned to Panelefsiniakos in summer 2013, 9 years since he left the team.

External links
Myplayer.gr Profile

1984 births
Living people
Greek footballers
Kalamata F.C. players
Ethnikos Asteras F.C. players
Kallithea F.C. players
Pierikos F.C. players
Association football defenders
Panelefsiniakos F.C. players
Footballers from Elefsina